St. Captain Freak Out And The Magic Bamboo Request is an album by Acid Mothers Temple & The Melting Paraiso U.F.O., released in 2002 by Ektro Records.

Track listing
"I am St. Captain Freak Out"
"Planet Pussy Virgo"
"Cosmic Magic of Love Part 1"
"Dead Man is Smoking"
"Porks' Bomb in Aztec Part 0"
"Hi Twiggy Cheesecake"
"A Bamboo is as Close as Miss Trout to Mashmallows"
"Sir Satanic Magic Bamboo Jerks Off"
"Maggot Head Cheese"
"Man on the Holy Mountain"
"Sweet Lucille or Lick My Milk Off, Baby"
"Cosmic Magic of Love Part 2"

Credits
The credits are stated as such:
 Kawabata Makoto - Electric guitars, synthesizer, percussion, speed guru
 Cotton Super Casino - Synthesizer, sitar, beer & cigarettes
 Tsuyama Atsushi - Monster bass, acoustic guitar, spaghetti western guitar, cosmic joker
 Higashi Hiroshi - Synthesizer, dancin' king
 Okano - Drums, god speed
 Koizumi Hajime - Drums, sleeping monk
 Uki Eiji - Drums

Additional personnel
 Father Moo - Moooooooooooooooooooo

2002 albums
Acid Mothers Temple albums
Acid rock albums